The Madison Masonic Temple is a masonic temple located in Madison, Wisconsin. Designed by Madison architects James R. and Edward J. Law in 1915 and redesigned after World War I in 1922, the temple was built during 1923 to 1925.  It was listed on the National Register of Historic Places in 1990.

It is a three-story building with four colossal columns in its front facade, with its three main entrances set back from them.

The auditorium and other spaces are used by the public for rehearsals and performances.

References

External links

 Madison Masonic Center

Clubhouses on the National Register of Historic Places in Wisconsin
Neoclassical architecture in Wisconsin
Masonic buildings completed in 1923
Buildings and structures in Madison, Wisconsin
Masonic buildings in Wisconsin
National Register of Historic Places in Madison, Wisconsin
Music venues in Wisconsin